Cassidy Creek is a stream in Fleming County, Kentucky, in the United States. It is a tributary of the Licking River.

Cassidy Creek was named for Michael Cassidy, a pioneer settler.

See also
List of rivers of Kentucky

References

Rivers of Fleming County, Kentucky
Rivers of Kentucky
Tributaries of the Ohio River